Moirangmayum Ashok Singh  (born 7 April 1993) is an Indian professional footballer who plays as a defender from Manipur who currently plays for Gokulam Kerala F.C. in the I-League.

Career

Gokulam Kerala fc
On 5 July 2019, it was announced that Ashok Singh signed for Gokulam Kerala in the I-League

Career statistics

Honours
Gokulam Kerala
Durand Cup: 2019

References

External links

Living people
1993 births
Footballers from Manipur
NEROCA FC players
Indian footballers
Association football defenders
I-League players
Gokulam Kerala FC players